NGC 284 is an elliptical galaxy in the constellation Cetus. It was discovered on October 2, 1886 by Francis Leavenworth.

References

External links
 

0284
18861002
Cetus (constellation)
Discoveries by Francis Leavenworth
Elliptical galaxies
-02-03-032
3131
2MASS objects